Le Globe was a French newspaper, published in Paris by the Bureau du Globe between 1824 and 1832, and created with the goal of publishing Romantic creations. It was established by Pierre Leroux and the printer Alexandre Lachevardière. After 1828, the paper became political and Liberal in tone.

The Aide-toi, le ciel t'aidera association's organ was first Le Globe and then Le National. Charles Renouard was among the liberals who opposed the Bourbon Restoration.
He was a member of the "Aide-toi" society and participated in the creation of the Globe.
He was the lawyer for this journal, and contributed to it regularly from 1825 to 1827. Goethe was a regular subscriber from 1824 and declared it "among the most interesting periodicals" and that he "could not do without it."

The Saint-Simonists bought the newspaper in 1830, and was the official voice of the movement under the July Monarchy.

Le Globe is notably as the first French periodical to introduce the term socialism in 1832, marking the second major introduction of that term after the London Cooperative Magazine in the United Kingdom in 1827.

The newspaper was ultimately banned, following the denunciation of Saint-Simonianism as an anti-establishment "sect".

Notable contributors
Jean-Jacques Ampère
Jean-Georges Farcy
François Guizot
Prosper Duvergier de Hauranne
Charles Magnin
Charles de Rémusat
Charles Augustin Sainte-Beuve
Ludovic Vitet
Louis Viardot

Saint-Simonists
Michel Chevalier
Barthélemy Prosper Enfantin
Charles Joseph Lambert
Olinde Rodrigues

References

Sources

1824 establishments in France
1832 disestablishments in France
Bourbon Restoration
Defunct newspapers published in France
July Monarchy
Newspapers published in Paris
Publications established in 1824
Publications disestablished in 1832
Romanticism
Saint-Simonianism
Socialist newspapers